King's Lynn Stadium, also known as the Adrian Flux Arena and previously as the Norfolk Arena, is a short oval stadium situated to the south of King's Lynn on Saddlebow Road in Norfolk County, England. It currently hosts BriSCA Formula 1 Stock Car Racing, Banger racing, motorcycle speedway and is also a former greyhound racing track.

Origins
The stadium was constructed in 1951 on the west side of Saddlebow Road next door to a poultry farm. It originally opened for greyhound racing.

Stock car racing
Since 1955 it has hosted BriSCA Formula 1 Stock Car Racing for which it has hosted World Final events for in 2007, 2009, 2013, 2015 and 2019.  It's set to hold the World Final again in September 2020 with this year's winner Tom Harris defending his title.

Speedway

The stadium has been the home of the King's Lynn Stars speedway team since 1965. It hosted the Final of the 1984 European (World) Under-21 Championship won by England's Marvyn Cox.

Sidecar Speedway
Three wheeled Motorcycle racing have been a regular visitor to Saddlebow Road over the years. The most prodigious event being the World Cup (The Gold Trophy). It was hosted in 2008 and won by Australian's Darrrin Treloar & Justin Plaisted.

Greyhound racing
Racing started on 27 August 1951 and was independent (not affiliated to the sports governing body the National Greyhound Racing Club). The racing is believed to have ended sometime during 1966.

Other uses
Other short oval formulas such as Banger racing also appear regularly at the track and the stadium also hosts drifting and stunt events.

References

Speedway venues in England
Defunct greyhound racing venues in the United Kingdom